Martha Carrillo (born Martha Leticia Carrillo Perea on October 25, 1963 in Mérida, Yucatán, Mexico) is a Mexican journalist and writer. She works for Televisa.

Her adaptations include : Tres mujeres in 1999, Bajo la misma piel in 2003, En Nombre Del Amor in 2008, Cuando Me Enamoro in 2010 and Amor bravío in 2012.

Partial filmography

Reality television 
Operación Triunfo (Mexican TV series)

Series 
S.O.S.: Sexo y otros Secretos (with Cristina García)

Telenovelas 
A que no me dejas (with Cristina García)
Alondra (Yolanda Vargas Dulché played a role) 
Amor bravío (with Cristina García and co-adapted with Denisse Pfeiffer) 
Atrévete a Olvidarme (with Roberto Hernández Vázquez and Martha Oláiz)
Bajo la misma piel (with Cristina García)
Cuando Me Enamoro (with Cristina García and partly co-adapted with Denisse Pfeiffer)
Mi Destino Eres Tú (with Cristina García)
Quiero amarte (with Cristina García)
Tres mujeres (with Cristina García)
Y mañana será otro día (with Cristina García)

Prizes and nominations

Premios TVyNovelas

External links 

Mexican dramatists and playwrights
Mexican women writers
1953 births
Living people